Hurricane Gladys was the first Atlantic hurricane to be observed each by the hurricane hunters, radar imagery, and photographs from space. The seventh named storm and fifth hurricane (including one unnamed hurricane) of the 1968 season, Gladys formed on October 13 in the western Caribbean from a broad disturbance related to a tropical wave. The storm moved north-northwestward, becoming a hurricane before striking Cuba on October 16. Gladys later reached peak winds of  just before making landfall near Homosassa on the western coast of Florida on October 19. The hurricane crossed the state and continued northeastward, passing just east of Cape Hatteras on October 20. The next day, Gladys became extratropical and was absorbed by a cold front over Nova Scotia.

In Cuba, the threat of the hurricane prompted widespread evacuations. Gladys caused flash flooding and heavily damaged the tobacco crop. Damage in the country was estimated at $12 million (1968 USD), and there were six deaths. While passing west of the Florida Keys, the hurricane produced strong winds that briefly cut communications to the Dry Tortugas, but damage was minor. There was heavy beach erosion and flooding along the coast, while the winds knocked down trees and caused power outages. Across the state, damage was estimated at $6.7 million (1968 USD), and three people were indirectly killed. Heavy rainfall in South Carolina caused minor river flooding. When paralleling just off the coast of North Carolina, Gladys was responsible for breaking the state's worst drought since 1932, and proved more beneficial than the minor storm damage there. Later, Gladys killed two people in Atlantic Canada and caused coastal damage in Prince Edward Island.

Meteorological history

The origins of Hurricane Gladys were from a tropical wave – a trough embedded in the trade winds – that moved across the Lesser Antilles on October 6. For the next few days, the wave moved across the Caribbean without any development. As the wave interacted with the Intertropical Convergence Zone, a large area of convection persisted across the region, spawning a series of low-pressure areas. One became a tropical depression near Swan Island offshore Honduras on October 11, and two days later another tropical depression formed near San Andrés island in the extreme southwestern Caribbean. The latter system, which would eventually become Gladys, moved slowly north-northwestward. An anticyclone in the region caused wind shear to decrease, allowing for gradual development.

After becoming a tropical storm, Gladys intensified into a hurricane near the Isle of Youth on October 16. Shortly thereafter it crossed the narrow but mountainous region of western Cuba. By the time the hurricane reached the southeastern Gulf of Mexico, a deep trough was moving eastward through the United States toward a weak anticyclone off the east coast. Gladys turned more to the north, passing just west of the Dry Tortugas, before resuming its north-northwest trajectory, possibly due to a mid-level low near Alabama. Around that time, the eye was reorganizing offshore southwestern Florida, and the hurricane failed to intensify significantly due to the eastern portion of the circulation being over the state. It accelerated across the state due to the approaching trough, emerging into the Atlantic near St. Augustine. Paralleling the southeastern coast of the United States, Gladys passed just east of Cape Hatteras on October 20, although by that time the strongest winds remained along the eastern periphery. The approaching trough caused Gladys to gradually lose tropical characteristics, and on October 21 Gladys became extratropical just south of Nova Scotia. A few hours later, the former hurricane was absorbed by the cold front.

Hurricane Gladys was active during the Apollo 7 spaceflight mission, and astronauts aboard took several pictures of the hurricane. Later, researchers were able to compare the photographs to airforce reconnaissance data, radar, and local weather networks, the first such hurricane to be observed with such varied data.

Preparations
In advance of the storm, Cuban officials forced about 36,000 residents to evacuate from low-lying areas, along with 35,000 livestock. All flights were canceled in and out of Havana during the storm's passage. Many classes were canceled in the region, and workers took steps to minimize damage to the tobacco crop.

Shortly after Gladys became a tropical storm, the NHC issued gale warnings for the Florida Keys and later a hurricane watch for the southwest Florida coast from the Florida Keys to Clearwater. After Gladys entered the Gulf of Mexico, the NHC issued hurricane warnings for the Florida Keys to Cedar Key, with a watch to St. Marks. Later, hurricane warnings were issued from Charleston, South Carolina to Hatteras, North Carolina. Before Gladys made landfall in Florida, all schools in Pinellas County were closed, and officials evacuated 60 jet fighters from MacDill Air Force Base to Mississippi. , which was visiting St. Petersburg, rode out the storm in the open Gulf of Mexico. The American Red Cross opened shelters across western Florida for people to stay in during the storm, and about 40,000 people evacuated their homes during the storm's passage. Then-governor Claude R. Kirk Jr. ordered 100 Florida guardsmen to assist with storm work. Shelters were set up in North Carolina, although few people evacuated.

Impact

On the Cuban mainland, a station in Havana reported gale-force winds for several hours. The hurricane dropped heavy rainfall, causing flash flooding that damaged factories and crops; the tobacco crop sustained heavy losses to the extent that the Monthly Weather Review described it as "virtually wiped out". In Havana, floodwaters from the storm wrecked houses and other buildings, while in San Antonio de los Baños, residents required rescue from their flooded houses. After the storm, Cuban officials advised residents in Havana to boil their water to prevent the spread of disease, after water lines were damaged. At least 36,000 people were left homeless as a result of the storm. Throughout Cuba, Gladys caused $12 million in damage and six deaths.

Communications were briefly cut to the island during the storm.

Winds in eastern Florida were not as strong. The town of Sunset Beach was almost entirely under water during the high storm tides. Elsewhere, the high waves wrecked boat houses, and portions of the seawall were washed out in Tierra Verde. Gladys also spawned two tornadoes in the state, one each in Boca Raton and Palatka. The one in Boca Raton damaged a warehouse, while a waterspout in Whitfield Estates damaged three homes. According to locals, several other tornadoes touched down in Volusia and Putnam counties, based on the falling of trees and visible twisting trail of damage Across Florida, Gladys downed many trees and power lines, and the NHC office briefly lost power for two hours. Gladys affected about 85% of the citrus crop to some degree, although crop damage was fairly minimal, with about 10% lost in Pinellas and west Pasco counties. There was widespread property damage due to the strong winds, particularly to mobile homes. Strong winds in Pinellas County knocked over trailers and damaged billboards. In Ocala, most roads were blocked by fallen trees and power lines. Two people died in the state due to storm-induced heart attacks, and another person died after driving into a flooded ditch. Damage in the state totaled $6.7 million, mostly to private property, and due to the damage, portions of the state were later declared a federal disaster area. The Small Business Administration authorized low-interest loans to homes and businesses damaged during the storm.

In the state, the rains caused minor river flooding and left minor damage to the cotton crop, while high tides eroded beaches. The strongest winds were only along the immediate coastline due to the hurricane passing offshore. The storm knocked two houses off their foundations and severely damaged a business and a mobile home. Rainfall in the state helped end break the worst drought since 1932, and the minimal storm damage was offset by the beneficial precipitation. Farther inland, rains from Gladys caused the Roanoke River to rise  near Roanoke, just below flood stage.

In the province, the former hurricane also produced 1.38 in (35 mm) of snow in Upsalquitch. Precipitation from the storm spread as far west as Quebec and as far northeast as Newfoundland, causing flooding in New Brunswick and Nova Scotia. Along Cape Breton Island, the remnants of Gladys killed one person and injured four. In Prince Edward Island, wind gusts reached  in Charlottetown, strong enough to knock over a tree and kill a man driving in Alberton. The storm washed out a portion of a bridge near Alberton and part of a wharf in Miminegash, and damaged 35 boats. Ferry service was disrupted between the Canadian Maritime provinces.

See also

 Hurricane Irene (1999) – a hurricane that took a similar track, causing moderate damage throughout its path
 Other storms with the same name
 List of Florida hurricanes (1950–1974)

References

Gladys
Gladys (1968)
Gladys (1968)
Gladys (1968)
Gladys (1968)
1968 natural disasters in the United States